Youtz is a surname. Notable people with the surname include:
Byron Youtz, acting president of Reed College in summer 1968
Cleo Youtz (1909–2005), American statistician
Gregory Youtz, composer, 1984 Charles Ives Prize winner
Karena Youtz, poet and song lyricist in Poetry Bus Tour, sister of Ralf
Ralf Youtz (born 1972), American rock drummer, brother of Karena